Morgan Ram Newman (born 5 February 1986) is a South African rugby union player, currently playing with Western Province Premier League side Hamiltons.

References

South African rugby union players
Living people
1986 births
Rugby union players from Cape Town
Stellenbosch University alumni
Stormers players
Western Province (rugby union) players
Rugby union centres